Peder Falstad (February 7, 1894 – February 11, 1965) was an American ski jumper. He competed in the individual event at the 1932 Winter Olympics.

References

1894 births
1965 deaths
American male ski jumpers
Olympic ski jumpers of the United States
Ski jumpers at the 1932 Winter Olympics
People from Snåsa